Wilpon is a surname. Notable people with the surname include:

Fred Wilpon (born 1936), real estate developer, baseball executive, and team owner
Jeff Wilpon (born 1961), baseball executive, financial executive, and museum director, son of Fred

See also
Wilson (name)